Lisa Janti (born July 5, 1933), known as Lisa Montell when performing as a Hollywood actress of the 1950–60s, later shifted her career to one of advocacy and service to various disadvantaged groups and to her adopted religion, the Baháʼí Faith.

Biography
Lisa Janti, known as Lisa Montell, was a Hollywood actress of the 1950–60s, was born Irena Ludmila Vladimirovna Augustynowic of Russian and Polish descent on July 5, 1933. Her family fled Poland before World War II. On arrival in New York they changed their last name to Montwill so she grew up Irene Montwill. They lived in New York and Janti attended the Fiorello H. LaGuardia High School of Music & Art and Performing Arts but transferred to High School of Performing Arts after it opened in 1948 where she became involved with acting.

However her family moved her senior year in high school to Fort Pierce, Florida where she graduated from St. Lucie High School and then began taking courses at the University of Miami. Shortly her family moved to Peru where her father had a business interest. After becoming involved in English-speaking theatre she was noticed by Hollywood producer Dick Welding who offered her a part in Daughter of the Sun God, filmed in Peru c. 1953 with actor William Holmes, (though it wasn't released until 1962.) Shortly afterwards her father died and the family chose to follow the opportunity Hollywood was giving her with her career. Her first role may have been in 1954 in the TV series The Public Defender, based on the film of the same name.

In 1956, she joined the Baháʼí Faith. Janti states that her family background included a diverse religious family history of Orthodox Russian and Islam (paternal grandmother), Catholicism (father & paternal grandfather), Protestant (mother), and Judaism (maternal grandmother). Janti herself was baptized Lutheran. In addition to her diverse background she explored various religions and philosophies, including studying with Manly Palmer Hall, when she learned of the religion. She learned of the Baháʼí Faith from other actors in a workshop and in her first meeting with Baháʼís they resolved some questions she still had from her previous studies with the teaching of Progressive Revelation. In addition she had a profound personal experience affirming Baháʼu'lláh. For Janti joining the religion played a role in changing her career from an actor to a social development advocate which she felt was a more fulfilling way of serving the religion than as a celebrity.

She married in 1957 and gave birth to a daughter two years later. Her first public talks for the religion began by 1960. By 1962 her continued discomfort with the trend of Hollywood movies according to her point of view continued her seeking to be of greater service than being a celebrity that could bring attention to causes. She was drifting away from her acting career and began to work on several advocacy/service projects while continuing to work in the arts. About 1962-3 she was a chair of Human Relations Committee of Culver City and was giving talks on race unity. She also worked on Project People which she co-hosted with Tom Bradley around 1963-4 (before he became mayor of Los Angeles) on KCOP-TV, was among the group addressing a panel of Hopi leaders at a World Peace Day observance and gave several talks as part of World Peace Day observances in Phoenix including one in Spanish.

In 1964, she spoke at a Baháʼí youth conference in Pasadena as well as another talk at a Baháʼí event on race unity in Westwood. In 1965, she spoke at a Temple City Baháʼí event, and finally broke from acting completely. She spoke at a 100th anniversary observance of the Baháʼí Faith and moved to Tucson as a director of a reading institute Child Development Centers Inc. After some years of volunteering at Head Start beginning in 1965 in Watts by 1970, she had taken a position directing a Head Start program near Tucson Arizona for the Tohono O'odham on their Reservation.

By this time Janti had also been chair of the Spiritual Assembly of the Baháʼís of Culver City and serving as a delegate to the national Baháʼí convention multiple times. She attempted to pioneer internationally to Ghana but a change in policy of the government ended her opportunity there before she could start. Instead she continued her talks for the religion, and took a position with Bradley's administration after 1973 by being a liaison with various coalitions and commissions, dealing with various poverty, elderly, art and youth programs and continued advocacy through Baháʼí talks for equality for women at different conferences including one highlighting the 1975 UN Women's Conference in Mexico. And she served as chair of the Los Angeles Baháʼí Spiritual Assembly while honoring the educational center Plaza de la Raza with a replica of the Aztec calendar stone.

By the 1980s, Janti left Tom Bradley's staff, took graduate courses, and then served on the faculty of School of Education at National University near San Diego teaching courses in holistic education based on the ANISA model. She also continued to speak at Baháʼí conferences like the Oregon state women's conference, served on the team commemorating Dizzy Gillespie's 50th yr in music in 1985 and was on the team giving a "spiritual parenting" workshop at a children's conference in Pasadena in 1987.

In 1992, she worked on projects for the city of Los Angeles and as executive director of U.P. Inc. founded by David Viscott. From November 2000 to September 2001,

Janti worked on the Commission on Older Americans for Santa Monica. After publishing an introductory text on the religion in 2005, she served as the program director of the Desert Rose Baháʼí Institute at least circa 2008-9 and she continued to write.

Film and television
Most of her later career was in the Western genre. Her first role may have been in 1954 in the TV series The Public Defender, based on the film of the same name. On television, she appeared in 1955 as Rosa on the TV western Cheyenne in the episode "Border Showdown" (Showdown in Paso Also). In 1956 in Jane Wyman's Fireside Theater episode of "A Time To Live", in the Sugarfoot show episode "Guns for Big Bear" in 1958 and in the 1960 S2E15 episode "Pigeon and Hawk" in Bat Masterson. In 1962 she was in Combat! episode "A Day in June".

Janti was known as the "Starlet of many faces" probably portraying more diverse ethnic roles though she was Polish including Polynesian, Native American, Mexican, Burmese, French, Italian, Spanish, east Indian and Persian – roles with dubious cultural and sexist stereotypes. Among the productions Janti was cast in are She Gods of Shark Reef, Ten Thousand Bedrooms, Pearl of the South Pacific, Jump Into Hell, The Lone Ranger and the Lost City of Gold, and World Without End.

Further research

References

External links
Lisa Janti
Interview Podcast of Lisa Janti
IMDb entry for Lisa Montell

Polish emigrants to the United States
American people of Russian descent
American Bahá'ís
American film actresses
American television actresses
Living people
1933 births
Converts to the Bahá'i Faith from Protestantism
20th-century Bahá'ís
21st-century Bahá'ís
20th-century American actresses
21st-century American women